Cape Chelyuskin (Mys Chelyuskina) is the northernmost point of the Afro-Eurasian continent (and indeed of any continental mainland), and the northernmost point of mainland Russia. It is situated at the tip of the Taymyr Peninsula, south of Severnaya Zemlya archipelago, in Krasnoyarsk Krai, Russia. The headland has a  light on a framework tower.

Cape Vega is a headland located a little to the west of Cape Chelyuskin. Oscar Bay lies between both capes.

History
The cape was first reached in May 1742 by an expedition on land party led by Semion Chelyuskin, and was initially called Cape East-Northern. It was renamed in honour of Chelyuskin by the Russian Geographical Society in 1842, on the 100th anniversary of the discovery.

It was passed on August 18, 1878, by Adolf Erik Nordenskiöld during the first sea voyage through the North-East Passage.

In 1919 Norwegian explorer Roald Amundsen's ship Maud left behind two men, Peter Tessem and Paul Knutsen, at Cape Chelyuskin after having made winter quarters there. The Maud continued eastwards into the Laptev Sea and the men were instructed to wait for the freeze-up of the Kara Sea and then sledge southwestwards towards Dikson carrying Amundsen's mail. However, these two men disappeared mysteriously. In 1922 Nikifor Begichev led a Soviet expedition in search for Peter Tessem and Paul Knutsen on request of the government of Norway, but Begichev was not successful. Clues to their fate were not found until 1922.

A weather and a hydrology research base named "Polar Station Cape Chelyuskin" was constructed in 1932, and headed by Ivan Papanin. It was renamed the "E. K. Fyodorov Hydrometeorological Observatory" in 1983. The station has a magnetic observatory and stands on the eastern side of the point.

Systematic geological survey for uranium began here in 1946–47 with industrial extraction between 1950 and 1952 in a mountain 150 km south of the cape proper.

The cape hosts the northernmost airfield in Afro-Eurasia, in operation at various locations since 1950.

Climate

Cape Chelyuskin has a tundra climate (Köppen climate classification ET), with no month having a low above freezing.  Winters last year round, but may be broken up during the meteorological summer months by short spells of above average temperatures. Snowfall is usual year round, with every year experiencing snow during every month including summer. Sunshine hours peak during April, and begin to sharply drop off during the end of July or early August.

Photo gallery

See also
List of research stations in the Arctic
List of northernmost items

References

Further reading
 William Barr, The Last Journey of Peter Tessem and Paul Knutsen, 1919.

External links
17th Century Cape Exploration note
Russian-Soviet polar stations and their role in the Arctic Seas exploration
North Pole Drifting Stations (1930s-1980s)

Extreme points of Earth
Chelyuskin
Chelyuskin
Chelyuskin